American rapper Flo Rida has released four studio albums, four extended plays, 40 singles as a lead artist (28 of which comprise featured appearances), twelve promotional singles, and 24 music videos. Growing up in Florida, the state from which his name was derived, he was involved in a hip hop group in his teenage years. A solo demo recording initially met rejection from several label companies, but was eventually accepted by Poe Boy Entertainment, with whom Flo Rida was signed in 2006.

His debut single "Low" featuring T-Pain was released in 2007 and reached number one in many countries, including Australia, Canada, Ireland, New Zealand and the United States. "Low" was featured on the track listing of the soundtrack to Step Up 2: The Streets, and stayed atop the Billboard Hot 100 for ten weeks, going on to be certified diamond by the Recording Industry Association of America (RIAA). The song was included on his debut album Mail on Sunday which peaked at number four on the Billboard 200 following its release in 2008. Following singles "Elevator" featuring Timbaland, and "In the Ayer" featuring will.i.am both peaked within the top twenty in the five aforementioned countries. In the same year, a collaboration with Jessica Mauboy on "Running Back" reached number three in Australia, and was certified double platinum there.

In 2009, Flo Rida released his second studio album R.O.O.T.S.; its lead single "Right Round" topped the national charts of Canada, Germany, Ireland, and the United Kingdom, in addition to the American one, where it remained for six consecutive weeks. The single, which features Kesha, was eventually certified 4× platinum in the US, and triple platinum in Australia, and Canada. Four additional singles were released from the album: "Shone", "Sugar" featuring Wynter, "Jump" featuring Nelly Furtado, and "Be on You" featuring Ne-Yo; "Sugar" and "Be on You" peaked in the top twenty of the Billboard Hot 100. R.O.O.T.S. peaked at number 8 in the US and number 5 in the UK. In 2009, Flo Rida also appeared on The X Factor winner Alexandra Burke's "Bad Boys", a number-one single in both Ireland, and the UK. The following year, a featured appearance on The Saturdays' "Higher" managed to reach number 10 in the UK.

Flo Rida's next two studio albums were announced in 2010 as a two-part oeuvre. Only One Flo (Part 1), which was released in November 2010 to showcase melodic talent, contains the David Guetta-assisted "Club Can't Handle Me", a number one single in Ireland, and the UK. The album's second single "Turn Around (5, 4, 3, 2, 1)" has reached the top 40 in Australia, and New Zealand, and third single "Who Dat Girl" featuring Akon has charted in several countries, including the top 30 in the US and the top 10 in Australia. Follow-up album Wild Ones (originally titled Only One Rida (Part 2)) was released in July 2012. It is Flo Rida's most successful studio album, with a string of global top 5 hits, including "Good Feeling", "Wild Ones", "Whistle" and "I Cry".

In 2015, Flo Rida's 2014 single "G.D.F.R." peaked at number 8 on the Billboard' Hot 100 and was later certified triple platinum by the RIAA. In 2016, Flo Rida's 2015 single "My House" peaked at number 4 on the Hot 100 making it his eleventh top 10 single.

Albums

Studio albums

Extended plays

Singles

As lead artist

As featured artist

Promotional singles

Other charted songs

Guest appearances

Music videos

As lead artist

As featured artist

Notes

References

External links
 
 
 
 

Discographies of American artists
Hip hop discographies
Pop music discographies